Marcus Martin (born November 29, 1993) is an American football guard who is a free agent. He was drafted by the San Francisco 49ers in the third round of the 2014 NFL Draft. He played college football at USC.

Early years
Martin attended Crenshaw High School in Los Angeles, California. As a senior, he helped the team win the 2010 L.A. City Division I championship. He received All-L.A. City,All-State Division 1 first-team, Offense Defense Bowl All-American, Offensive Lineman of the Year and Los Angeles Times All-Star honors.

He was considered a three-star recruit by Rivals.com and was rated as the 28th best offensive guard prospect of his class.

College career
Martin accepted a football scholarship from the University of Southern California. As a true freshman, he started 10 games and earned freshman all-American honors at left guard.

As a sophomore, he started 10 games at left guard. As a junior, he was voted a team captain and moved to center starting 13 games earning 1st team All-Pac-12. He suffered knee and ankle injuries in the season finale against UCLA and did not play in the 2013 Las Vegas Bowl.

He declared for the NFL Draft after his junior season. During his college career he had 20 starts at center and 13 at left guard.

Professional career

San Francisco 49ers
Martin was selected by the San Francisco 49ers in the third round (70th overall) of the 2014 NFL Draft. He was the second center to be selected and one of three USC Trojans to be selected that year. As a rookie, he suffered a dislocated kneecap in the third preseason game against the San Diego Chargers and was forced to miss the first two months of the regular season. He started the last 8 games at center, after replacing Daniel Kilgore who broke his leg in the seventh game against the Denver Broncos.

In 2015, he was named the starter at center over Kilgore. He had 14 starts, with 13 coming at center and one and at right guard.

In 2016, he was passed on the depth chart by Kilgore. He appeared in four games, starting 2 at left guard, before being placed on the injured reserve list with an ankle injury on December 31. He was waived on March 8, 2017.

Cleveland Browns
On March 9, 2017, Martin was claimed off waivers by the Cleveland Browns. He did not play any snaps during the season as a backup behind Austin Reiter.

Dallas Cowboys
On March 26, 2018, Martin signed as a free agent with the Dallas Cowboys. He came into training camp out of shape and struggled. He suffered a torn ligament in the right big toe during the preseason opener against the San Francisco 49ers and was placed on injured reserve on August 13.

Seattle Seahawks
On May 9, 2019, Martin signed with the Seattle Seahawks. He was released on August 31, 2019.

Detroit Lions
On September 23, 2020, Martin was signed to the Detroit Lions' practice squad. He was elevated to the active roster on November 7 and December 19 for the team's weeks 9 and 15 games against the Minnesota Vikings and Tennessee Titans, and reverted to the practice squad after each game. He was released on December 22, 2020.

New England Patriots
On December 28, 2020, Martin was signed to the New England Patriots active roster. He was placed on injured reserve on August 24, 2021. He was released on September 2, 2021 with an injury settlement.

References

External links
USC Trojans bio

1993 births
Living people
Crenshaw High School alumni
Players of American football from Los Angeles
American football centers
USC Trojans football players
San Francisco 49ers players
Cleveland Browns players
Dallas Cowboys players
Seattle Seahawks players
Detroit Lions players
New England Patriots players